The Barmer Ruhmeshalle is a historic building in the Barmen district of the German town of Wuppertal, originally built as a hall of fame. It was officially known as the Kaiser Wilhelm- und Friedrich-Ruhmeshalle and later as the Haus der Jugend.

Bibliography 
 Lutz Engelskirchen: Die Barmer Ruhmeshalle. Von Bürgertum und Bürgergeist in Barmen. Göttingen: Cuvillier, 1996.

External links 

 Article on the Heydt-Museum Wuppertal site

Buildings and structures in Wuppertal